Rhabditis is a genus of nematodes in the family Rhabditidae.

 Names brought to synonymy
Rhabditis (Caenorhabditis) Osche, 1952 is a synonym for Caenorhabditis Dougherty, 1955

Species 
Rhabditis aberrans 
Rhabditis marina 
Rhabditis maxima 
Rhabditis necromena 
Rhabditis sylvatica 
Rhabditis terricola

References

External links 

 

Rhabditidae
Rhabditida genera